Route 136, or Highway 136, can refer to:

Argentina
National Route 136 (Argentina)

Canada
  Ontario Highway 136 (former)
  Prince Edward Island Route 136
  Quebec Route 136 (Montreal)
  Quebec Route 136 (Quebec City)

Costa Rica
 National Route 136

France
  D136 as at Guillaucourt or Tortefontaine
  Périphérique de Rennes (N136), Rennes

Germany
L 136 state road from Gräfenhainichen to Möhlau via Zschornewitz

India
 National Highway 136 (India)

Ireland
 R136 road

Japan
 Japan National Route 136
 Fukuoka Prefectural Route 136 from Sawara-ku, Fukuoka southeast to Miyaki District, Saga
 Nara Prefectural Route 136

Malaysia
 Malaysia Federal Route 136
 Jalan Kesang Laut

Mexico
 Mexican Federal Highway 136
 Mexican Federal Highway 136D

Norway
 European route E136

Sweden
Route 136 (Öland, Sweden)

United Kingdom
 A136 road

United States
 U.S. Route 136
 Alabama State Route 136
 Arkansas Highway 136
 California State Route 136
 Colorado State Highway 136
 Connecticut Route 136
 Florida State Road 136
 County Road 136 (Suwannee County, Florida)
 County Road 136A (Suwannee County, Florida)
 Georgia State Route 136
 Illinois Route 136
 Indiana State Road 136 (former)
 Iowa Highway 136
 K-136 (Kansas highway)
 Kentucky Route 136
 Louisiana Highway 136
 Louisiana State Route 136 (former)
 Maine State Route 136
 Maryland Route 136
 Massachusetts Route 136
 M-136 (Michigan highway)
 New Hampshire Route 136
 New Mexico State Road 136
 New York State Route 136
 County Route 136A (Cayuga County, New York)
 County Route 136 (Cortland County, New York)
 County Route 136 (Herkimer County, New York)
 County Route 136 (Jefferson County, New York)
 County Route 136 (Niagara County, New York)
 County Route 136 (Westchester County, New York)
 North Carolina Highway 136
 Ohio State Route 136
 Oklahoma State Highway 136
 Pennsylvania Route 136
 Rhode Island Route 136
 South Dakota Highway 136 (former)
 Tennessee State Route 136
 Texas State Highway 136
 Texas State Highway Spur 136
 Farm to Market Road 136
 Utah State Route 136
 Utah State Route 136 (1933-1969) (former)
 Virginia State Route 136
 Virginia State Route 136 (1930-1933) (former)
 Virginia State Route 136 (1933-1948) (former)
 Wisconsin Highway 136
 Wyoming Highway 136

Territories
 Puerto Rico Highway 136